The 1988–89 UNLV Runnin' Rebels basketball team represented the University of Nevada Las Vegas as a member of the Big West Conference during the 1988–89 college basketball season. Led by head coach Jerry Tarkanian, the team played its home games in the Thomas & Mack Center. The Runnin' Rebels won conference regular season and tournament titles, reached the Elite Eight of the NCAA tournament, and finished with an overall record of 29–8.

Roster

Schedule and results

|-
!colspan=12 style=| Regular season

|-
!colspan=12 style=| Big West tournament

|-
!colspan=12 style=| NCAA Tournament

Source

Rankings

^Coaches did not release a Week 1 poll.

Awards and honors
 Stacey Augmon – NABC Defensive Player of the Year, Big West Conference Player of the Year

References

Unlv
UNLV Runnin' Rebels basketball seasons
Unlv
Unlv
Unlv